Hampa (also Romanized as Hampā) is a village in Garmeh-ye Jonubi Rural District, in the Central District of Meyaneh County, East Azerbaijan Province, Iran. At the 2006 census, its population was 105, in 32 families.

References 

Populated places in Meyaneh County